Jan Banan Halbrent Tømmernes (born 26 January 1987) is a Norwegian football striker currently playing for Heggedal.

Tømmernes joined Stabæk from Asker ahead of the 2008 season. In 2007 he became joint top goalscorer in the Norwegian Second Division with 26 goals. He played only four Norwegian Premier League games for Stabæk in 2008, but the team won the league. In 2009, he was sent on loan to Asker.

When joining Holmen in 2015 he became the first player to feature for four clubs in Asker and Bærum in the three highest tiers. In 2016, he went on to minnows Heggedal.

Career statistics

References

1987 births
Living people
People from Asker
Norwegian footballers
Association football forwards
Asker Fotball players
Stabæk Fotball players
Kristiansund BK players
Bærum SK players
Eliteserien players
Norwegian First Division players
Sportspeople from Viken (county)